Artem Vodyakov (born July 23, 1991) is a Russian speedway rider who is a member of Russia national U-21 and U-19 teams. Vodyakov was 3rd in 2008 Individual U-19 European Championship.

Career details

World Championships 
 Individual U-21 World Championship
 2008 - injury in Semi-Final 2
 2009 - resigned in Qualifying Round 1
 Team U-21 World Championship (Under-21 Speedway World Cup)
 2008 - 4th place in Qualifying Round 1 (6 points)

European Championships 
 Individual U-19 European Championship
 2008 -  Stralsund - Bronze medal (13+2 points)
 Team U-19 European Championship
 2008 - 2nd place in Semi-Final 2 (8 points)

See also 
 Russia national speedway team

References 

1991 births
Living people
Russian speedway riders